David Hinchliffe (12 January 1939 – 27 September 2020) was an Australian rules footballer who played with Geelong in the Victorian Football League (VFL).

Notes

External links 

2020 deaths
1939 births
Australian rules footballers from Victoria (Australia)
Geelong Football Club players
People educated at Geelong College